Der Umbruch (lit. "The Upheaval", sometimes referred to by its nickname Der Bruch) was a newspaper published in Vaduz, Liechtenstein. It was the organ of the German National Movement in Liechtenstein (VDBL), a National Socialist political party.

Der Umbruch was published from 5 October 1940 to 6 July 1943. Initially it was published weekly, but shifted to publication twice per week in March 1941. Martin Hilti served as editor until 1942. Other contributors included Dr. Alfons Goop, Dr. Sepp Ritter and Dr. Hermann Walser. The newspaper was printed by U. Goppel.

Der Umbruch wrote enthusiastically about the advances of the German military across Europe. The readers were mainly found amongst the followers of the movement. As of 1942 the newspaper had a circulation of around 300. The newspaper was banned by the government in July 1943.

References

1940 establishments in Liechtenstein
1943 disestablishments in Liechtenstein
Defunct newspapers published in Liechtenstein
Liechtenstein culture
Nazi newspapers
Newspapers established in 1940
Publications disestablished in 1943